William Harding Longley (1881–1937) was an American botanist.

Longley was born in 1881 in Nova Scotia. He attended Acadia and Yale. From 1911 to 1937, he spent as a professor of biology and botany, at Goucher College in Baltimore. His biggest work in science was a study of roles of color and pattern in the tropical reef fishes, which was done with the assistance of Dry Tortugas Laboratory of the Carnegie Institution in Washington, where he worked as a director from 1922 to 1937. He studied distribution and evolution of the species as well. He studied a lot of plants in places like Hawaii, Samoa, Tortugas, and the Pacific, and examining some in European and American museums. he died in 1937.


See also
:Category:Taxa named by William Harding Longley

References

External links 
William Harding Longley: First underwater color photograph

American botanists
1881 births
1937 deaths
Acadia University alumni
Yale University alumni
Goucher College faculty and staff